KK, K.K., kK, k.k., or other sequences of two k's with or without punctuation may refer to:

Arts and media
KK, the production code for the 1967 Doctor Who serial The Faceless Ones
 "KK" (song), a 2014 song by Wiz Khalifa
 Kk. or Kirkpatrick number, a designation system for Domenico Scarlatti's keyboard sonatas, devised by Ralph Kirkpatrick
 Kobylańska Katalog or KK, catalogue of the works of Frédéric Chopin, authored by Krystyna Kobylańska
 Kvinner og Klær (Women and Clothes) or KK, a Norwegian weekly magazine
 Kritika Kultura or KK, a Philippine journal of literary, language and cultural studies

Language
 Kazakh language (ISO 639-1 code kk), a Turkic language
 Kenyon and Knott or KK Phonetic Transcription, a transcription system used in the 1944 Pronouncing Dictionary of American English
 Kernewek Kemmyn (Common Cornish), a variety of the Cornish language
 Kk (digraph), used to represent a consonant in various languages

People
 KK (singer), (Krishnakumar Kunnath, 1968–2022), Bollywood playback singer
 KK (musician) (born 1956), Icelandic musician
 KK (composer, producer) (born 1975), British record producer and musician
 KK Goswami (born 1973), Indian film and television actor
 K. K. Downing (born 1951), British musician
 K. Keshava Rao (born 1939), Indian politician
 Kay Kay Menon (born 1968), Indian actor
 Keke Rosberg (born 1948), Finnish racing driver
 Kenneth Kaunda (1924–2021), first president of Zambia
 Jesperi Kotkaniemi, Finnish ice hockey player
 Kwang-hyun Kim, Korean baseball player, plays for the St. Louis Cardinals
 KK, born Kelton L. McDonalda, rapper from the American rap group 2nd II None

Places
 Kinnickinnic River (Milwaukee River) or "KK River", which flows into Lake Michigan
 KK, an underground rail route replaced by the J/Z (New York City Subway service)
 Kota Kinabalu or KK, a city in Sabah, Malaysia
 Kuala Kangsar, royal town of Perak, Malaysia
 Kuala Kurau, a town in Kerian District, Perak Malaysia
 Kuala Klawang, a town in Jelebu District, Negeri Sembilan, Malaysia
 Northern Cyprus or by its Turkish name "Kuzey Kıbrıs"

Sport
 Karachi Kings, a cricket team franchise in Pakistan Super League

Other uses
 Kabushiki gaisha or kabushiki kaisha, a type of Japanese joint-stock company commonly abbreviated as "K.K."
 Kaluza–Klein theory, a theory in physics
 Karkat Vantas, a character from the webcomic Homestuck, frequently called "KK" by his friend Sollux
 AtlasGlobal (IATA airline designator KK), formerly Atlasjet, a Turkish airline
 Jeep Liberty (KK), a model of Jeep Liberty made from 2008 until 2012
 Kilokelvin (kK), a temperature or temperature difference of 1000 kelvins
 k.k. or k.-k. (kaiserlich-königlich), meaning "imperial-royal" in the Austrian and Austro-Hungarian Empires
 "kk", instant-messaging slang for "OK", an acceptance and indication that no further explanation is necessary
 KK-theory, in algebraic topology
 KK thesis, a principle of epistemology
 Krusty Krab, a fictional SpongeBob SquarePants restaurant
 K.K. Slider, a fictional character from the video game franchise Animal Crossing
 KK Super Mart, a convenience store chain in Malaysia

See also
 K&K (disambiguation)
 KK Mladost (disambiguation)
 KKAY, an FM radio station in White Castle, Louisiana
 Kay Kay and His Weathered Underground, a Seattle band